Mar Azul is a small coastal settlement in Buenos Aires Province, Argentina. It is located in Villa Gesell Partido.

The settlement has a recorded population of 569 after the 2001 census, an 800% increase from 92 residents recorded after the 1991 census. Mar Azul has been annexed by the city of Villa Gesell.

External links

 Mar Azul website
 Mar Azul cabañas 
 Mar Azul tourist site
 Tourism and information
 Mar Azul Travel and Tourist site

Populated places in Buenos Aires Province
Populated coastal places in Argentina
Seaside resorts in Argentina